Crescent is a Swedish bicycle brand.
Crescent started production in 1908. Although Crescent is a Swedish brand, its roots had begun in Chicago, where Western Wheel Works manufactured bikes with the same brand.

Crescent's factory is located in Varberg, Sweden. There is also a bicycle museum.

in late 1990s, Crescent has been part of Cycleurope, also Monark and Bianchi.

Mopeds and Strollers
Crescent started to make mopeds in 1952 and Strollers in 2007.

Boats
Crescent started to make also boats in 1957.

References

External links
 Crescentbikes history swedish
 Crescent bikes swedish

Cycling in Sweden
Cycle manufacturers of Sweden
Moped manufacturers
Companies based in Halland County